EVOS Esports (briefly known as Zero Latitude) is a professional esports organisation based in Jakarta, Indonesia. It has competitive teams in Arena of Valor, Free Fire, Mobile Legends: Bang Bang, PUBG Mobile and League of Legends: Wild Rift.

The organisation previously had a League of Legends team competing in the Vietnam Championship Series (VCS), the highest level of competitive League of Legends in the country. The team became VCS champions (a title held only by the GIGABYTE Marines at the time) on 7 April 2018, a feat accomplished during their first appearance in the league. This qualified them for the 2018 Mid-Season Invitational (MSI), where they performed above expectations against other more well-known international teams.

History

Arena of Valor 
EVOS Esports entered the competitive Arena of Valor scene in 2017 with its acquisition of an all-Indonesian roster. In August 2018, Hartawan "WyvorZ" Muliadi, Sultandyo "MythR" Raihan, and Hartanto "POKKA" Lius joined the team. EVOS won AOV Star League Season 2 on 16 February 2019, qualifying for the 2019 Arena of Valor World Cup as Indonesia's representative. 

EVOS disbanded its Arena of Valor Vietnam division on 4 December 2020.

League of Legends 
EVOS Esports' League of Legends team competes in the Vietnam Championship Series (VCS), the highest level of competitive League of Legends in Vietnam. In the VCS 2018 Spring Split, EVOS finished first in the regular season, ending with a 12–2 record. Their placement in the regular season secured EVOS a finals bye in playoffs, where they beat GIGABYTE Marines 3–2, qualifying them for the 2018 Mid-Season Invitational (MSI).

In the MSI 2018 main event qualifiers, EVOS beat SuperMassive eSports 3–1 to secure a spot in the main event. EVOS ended the main event at MSI 2018 with a 2–8 record, failing to qualify for playoffs.

EVOS' long time mid laner Đoàn "Warzone" Văn Ngọc Sơn retired from professional play on 15 September 2018 and became a streamer for the organisation. He was replaced by Võ "Petland" Huỳnh Quang Huy and Lê "Dia1" Phú Quý in preparation for the VCS 2019 Spring Split. EVOS placed third in the regular season with a 9–5 record, qualifying for playoffs. In the first round of playoffs, EVOS defeated Friends Forever 3–2 in a close series, and in the second round EVOS defeated Sky Gaming 3–1, moving on to face Phong Vũ Buffalo in the finals, which they lost 1–3.

EVOS disbanded its League of Legends division on 7 December 2020.

Mobile Legends: Bang Bang 
Evos Esports was created in September 2016 starting with their Dota division; the team began to form another division on other games such as Mobile Legends: Bang Bang. The team did well on the small tournaments and after their consecutive losses, they started to re-organize. From there, they started to get traction on the tournaments after finishing 2nd place in the first MPL and the succeeding season. In the next season, the team failed to qualify in play-offs after their 8th position ranking. Consequently, the team had to re-organize once again recruiting seasoned veterans of MPL such as Yurino "Donkey" Angkawidjaja and also new players Ihsan "Luminaire" Kusudana and Muhammad "Wannn" Ridwan. From the newly organized team, EVOS finished top seed on the Regular season of MPL Season 4 and defeated the RRQ on the grand finals lifting their first championship. EVOS was able to continue the momentum resulting in the first M1 World Title in 2019 on Kuala Lumpur.

The EVOS organization tried to enter in the Philippine scene by acquiring the MPL Philippines season 2 team SxC Imbalance, they were able to reach the playoffs, however, due to alleged corruption inside the Philippine franchise organization, the team departures on MPL-PH. The remaining players of former EVOS Philippines were acquired by Tier One Entertainment team Blacklist International.

In June 2021, EVOS Esports and Nexplay Esports announced a new collaboration to form Nexplay EVOS, a competitive esports team for Mobile Legends MPL PH Season 8 tournament.

References

External links 
 

2016 establishments in Indonesia
Esports teams established in 2016
Esports teams based in Indonesia
Arena of Valor teams
Counter-Strike teams
Dota teams
FIFA (video game series) teams
Mobile Legends: Bang Bang teams
PlayerUnknown's Battlegrounds teams
Former Vietnam Championship Series teams
League of Legends: Wild Rift teams